Swimming at the 1969 South Pacific Games took place in Port Moresby, the capital of Papua New Guinea on 18–22 August 1969. Fifteen South Pacific Games records were set in the finals, and one in the competition heats. Hosts Papua New Guinea won six of the ten events for men, and New Caledonia swept the pool in the women's competition, winning nine from nine events.

Medal summary

Medal table

Men

Women

Notes
GR denotes South Pacific Games record time.

Participating countries
Teams entered in the swimming competition included:

References

1969 Pacific Games
Pacific Games
Swimming at the Pacific Games